SS Mulbera was a British ocean liner owned by the  British-India Steam Navigation Company or "BI", built by Alexander Stephen and Sons of Glasgow, Scotland and delivered to the company in June 1922.

She sailed on the East African run which was (London to Marseilles, Port Said, Port Sudan, Aden, Mombasa, and a turnaround at Beira). She then later sailed on the Indian trade which was (London to Tangier, Malta, Port Said, Suez, Aden, Colombo, Madras, ending at Calcutta). The Beira run took thirty-days while the Calcutta run took thirty-days. In 1924 the newly married Duke and Duchess of York (later King George VI and Queen Elizabeth) boarded her at Marseilles for their voyage to East Africa.

References

Ocean liners
Ships of the British India Steam Navigation Company
Ships built on the River Clyde
1922 ships